The 2023 Cotton Bowl Classic was a college football bowl game played on January 2, 2023, at AT&T Stadium in Arlington, Texas. The 87th annual Cotton Bowl Classic, the game featured two teams selected at-large by the College Football Playoff selection committee — Tulane from the American Athletic Conference and USC from the Pac-12 Conference. The game began at 12:10 p.m. CST and was aired on ESPN. It was one of the 2022–23 bowl games concluding the 2022 FBS football season. Sponsored by the Goodyear Tire and Rubber Company, the game was officially known as the Goodyear Cotton Bowl Classic.

Teams
The game featured at-large teams selected by the College Football Playoff (CFP) selection committee.  Tulane qualified as the highest-ranked team from the Group of Five conferences.

This was the fourth meeting between the two teams and their first since 1946; USC led the all-time series, 2–1.  One of their meetings came in the 1932 Rose Bowl.  This was USC's third Cotton Bowl, they were 1–1 in previous appearances.  This was Tulane's first Cotton Bowl.

Tulane Green Wave

Tulane played to a 10–2 regular-season record (7–1 in conference). They faced two ranked teams, defeating Cincinnati and losing to UCF. Their only other loss was to Southern Miss. The Green Wave qualified for the AAC Championship Game, where they defeated UCF in a rematch. Tulane entered the Cotton Bowl with an 11–2 overall record.

USC Trojans

USC compiled an 11–1 record during the regular season (8–1 in conference). Their only loss was to Utah in mid-October. In addition to Utah, USC faced ranked teams UCLA and Notre Dame, defeating the latter two. The Trojans qualified for the Pac-12 Championship Game, where they lost to Utah in a rematch. USC entered the Cotton Bowl with an overall 11–2 record.

Game summary
USC had leads of 14–0 and 28–14 in the first half, and kicked a field goal with just 4:30 left in the game to take a 45–30 lead. Tulane responded by taking just 23 seconds to cut the lead to 45–37, and then registered a safety with 3:20 left to cut the lead to 45–39. Tulane then converted a pair of fourth downs on a 12-play, 66-yard drive, scoring the winning touchdown with just 9 seconds left in the game.

With the win, Tulane finished their season with an overall 12–2 record, a 10-win improvement over their prior season—the biggest single-season improvement in NCAA football history.

Statistics

References

Cotton Bowl Classic
Cotton Bowl Classic
Cotton Bowl Classic
Cotton Bowl Classic
Tulane Green Wave football bowl games
USC Trojans football bowl games